Dorrinton is a surname. Notable people with the surname include:

Alban Dorrinton (1800–1872), English cricketer
William Dorrinton (1809–1848), English cricketer, brother of Alban